Methylpentynol (Methylparafynol, Dormison, Atemorin, Oblivon) is a tertiary hexynol with hypnotic/sedative and anticonvulsant effects and an exceptionally low therapeutic index. It was discovered by Bayer in 1913 and was used shortly thereafter for the treatment of insomnia, but its use was quickly phased out in response to newer drugs with far more favorable safety profiles.

The drug was marketed again in the United States, Europe and elsewhere from 1956 well into the 1960s as a rapid-acting sedative. The drug was quickly overshadowed at that point by benzodiazepines and is no longer sold anywhere.

Synthesis
Methylpentynol is prepared by reaction of butanone (MEK) with sodium acetylide. This reaction must be done in anhydrous conditions and in an inert atmosphere.

Applications
As building block in the synthesis of: 
 Phthalofyne (1,2-Benzenedicarboxylic acid, mono(1-ethyl-1-methyl-2-propynyl) ester) [131-67-9]
 Anansiol (1-ethyl-1-methylprop-2-ynyl carbamate) [302-66-9]
 Bason ( 2-Bromoethynyl-2-butanol) [2028-52-6]

See also 
Clocental
Ethchlorvynol

References 

Alkynols
Anticonvulsants
GABAA receptor positive allosteric modulators
Tertiary alcohols
Abandoned drugs